The Wisconsin and Calumet Railroad  was a Class III shortline railroad that operated in the southern portion of Wisconsin and northern portion of Illinois from 1985 until 1997.

History 
In the late 1970s and early 1980s, financial difficulties forced the Chicago, Milwaukee, St. Paul and Pacific Railroad (Milwaukee Road) to abandon much of its trackage in Southern Wisconsin, including lines from Prairie du Chien to Madison, Madison to Janesville, and Janesville to Fox Lake, Illinois. At the same time, the Illinois Central Gulf Railroad abandoned its line from Madison to Freeport, Illinois. The Wisconsin Department of Transportation formed the Wisconsin River Rail Transit Commission (WRRTC) in March 1980 in the interest of preserving rail service on these lines. Two shortline operators, the Wisconsin Western Railroad (WIWR) and the affiliated Central Wisconsin Railroad (CWRC), were contracted to operate on the Prairie du Chien–Madison and Madison–Freeport lines.

These two operators filed for bankruptcy in December 1984, leaving WRRTC to find another operator. The Wisconsin and Calumet Railroad (WICT) was formed on January 1, 1985. WICT would eventually operate all of the above mentioned rail lines, as well as lines from Janesville to Waukesha and Janesville to Monroe. In 1989, the first Wisconsin and Calumet trains ran from Janesville to Fox Lake on the route known during the Milwaukee Road era as the "J-Line". Shortly thereafter, WICT reopened the line between Janesville and Madison, bringing rail service back to Milton, Edgerton, Stoughton, and McFarland.

The Wisconsin and Calumet Railroad was purchased by the Wisconsin and Southern Railroad in 1992, but it continued to operate as a subsidiary until it was officially merged into WSOR in 1997.

Timeline 
 1985: The Wisconsin and Calumet Railroad is formed.
 1989: Wisconsin and Calumet begins operating the rail lines from Janesville to Fox Lake and Janesville to Madison, restoring the entire railroad connection from Chicago to the Mississippi River via Southern Wisconsin.
 1992: The Wisconsin and Calumet Railroad is acquired by the Wisconsin and Southern Railroad.
 1993: The former Illinois Central Railroad line from Madison, Wisconsin, to Freeport, Illinois, is embargoed and placed out of service by WICT due to unsafe conditions. Despite initial plans to restore rail service to the line, it sat abandoned and was eventually removed to make way for a bike trail in 1999.
 1997: WICT is officially merged into the Wisconsin and Southern Railroad and ceases to exist as an employer, as ruled by the United States Railroad Retirement Board.

The route today 

Most of the rail lines operated by the Wisconsin and Calumet remain in service today under the Wisconsin and Southern Railroad, with the notable exception of the line from Madison to Freeport which was removed in 1999. The Badger State Trail currently occupies the old road bed.

Equipment and preservation 
The Wisconsin and Calumet Railroad's motive power primarily consisted of early generation GM-EMD Diesel-electric locomotives including the GP7, GP9, and F7. Many of these locomotives originally belonged to the Milwaukee Road. Others, including the F-units, were privately owned by an individual named Glen Monhart. WICT followed the (by then relatively unusual) practice of naming their locomotives. Several WICT locomotives were named after the counties the railroad served such as Dane County, Rock County, Walworth County, etc.

WICT EMD FP7 #96A was later repainted and renumbered to WSOR #71A and currently operates on the Escanaba and Lake Superior Railroad in Michigan and Northern Wisconsin as their #600. Several other ex-WICT F-units are stored on ELS property in Wells Township, Michigan. WICT caboose #529 (ex-Santa Fe) can be found at the Mid-Continent Railway Museum in North Freedom.

See also 

 List of defunct Wisconsin railroads

External links 
 1995 Status Report on Railroad Operations in Dane County, includes information about the WICT
 WICT employer status determination by the USRRB, December 1997
 History of the Wisconsin River Rail Transit Commission
 Photo gallery of WICT predecessors WIWR and CWRC locomotives in Madison in the 1980s
 Madison WMTV Channel 15 news video of WICT's first run on the Janesville–Fox Lake line in 1989
 1998 letter from WisDOT regarding decision to remove the Madison–Freeport line

Defunct Illinois railroads
Defunct Wisconsin railroads
Railway companies established in 1985
Railway companies disestablished in 1997
American companies established in 1985